Mandaram Nuwara (මන්දාරම්නුවර ) is a small village situated at the foot of Pidurutalagala (Mount Pedro) in the Central Province of Sri Lanka. The town is also known colloquially as the 'Misty City' as it is shadowed by the adjoining mountain ranges and is shrouded in mist for the majority of the day.

There are a number of waterfalls located near Mandaram Nuwara, including:

Elamulla Ella
Kabara-gala Ella
Digala Hinna Ella
Kalu Palam Ella
Kolapathana Ella

See also
List of towns in Central Province, Sri Lanka

References

External links

Mandaram Nuwara Visit

Populated places in Kandy District